Marsh Wheeling was founded by Mifflin M. Marsh in 1840. Located in Wheeling, West Virginia, it was the oldest cigar manufacturing company founded in the United States. After beginning production and sale from his home, Mr. Marsh developed the company and opened a factory first on Water Street and later on 12th Street between Water and Main. In 1908, the company opened the historic location at 905–915 Market Street. In 2001, the Wheeling plant was closed and the company was bought by National Cigar, which moved production to Frankfort, Indiana.

M. Marsh & Son is most notably remembered for the Marsh Wheeling brand of stogies. The cigar's famous box became a known staple of the tobacco industry. A box also appeared in the movie The Green Mile as the home of Mr. Jingles, a mouse kept by one of the prisoners. A Marsh Wheeling cigar box was also carried by a fisherman on the wharf in the movie Jaws.  In the fourth season of Mad Men, a box of Marsh Wheeling cigars can be seen on Peggy's desk the night she stays at work with Don to generate ideas for a Samsonite advertisement.

See also
List of cigar brands
List of historic sites in Ohio County, West Virginia

References

Cigar brands
Manufacturing companies established in 1840
Landmarks in West Virginia
Companies based in Wheeling, West Virginia
Defunct manufacturing companies based in West Virginia